The squamosal suture, or squamous suture, arches backward from the pterion and connects the temporal squama with the lower border of the parietal bone: this suture is continuous behind with the short, nearly horizontal parietomastoid suture, which unites the mastoid process of the temporal with the region of the mastoid angle of the parietal bone. The term parietotemporal suture may refer to both of these sutures or exclusively to the parietomastoid suture and its use is, therefore, best avoided.

Gallery

External links

Bones of the head and neck
Cranial sutures
Human head and neck
Joints of the head and neck
Skeletal system
Skull